Lemon Tree Passage may refer to:

Lemon Tree Passage, New South Wales
Lemon Tree Passage (film)